Giuseppe Alloia (active c. 1750), also known as Giuseppe Alloja or Aleja or Aloya was an Italian copper plate engraver and painter, working in Naples.

He engraved Statica de'Vegetabili in Neapolitan edition of 1775, and also engraved many frescoes unearthed in Herculaneum in three volumes of folios, published in 1757,1760, and 1762.

Notes
Engraving of peculiar carriage able to trave on sea and land.

Sources

Italian engravers
18th-century engravers